Ramadan Gashi (born 15 April 1958) is a politician in Kosovo. He was the mayor of Skenderaj (Serbian: Srbica) from 1999 to 2007 and was a member of the Assembly of Kosovo from 2008 to 2010. During his time as an elected official, Gashi was a member of the Democratic Party of Kosovo (Partia Demokratike e Kosovës, PDK).

He is not to be confused with a Kosovan diplomat of the same name.

Early life and career
Gashi was born in the village of Kryshec in Skenderaj/Srbica, in what was then the Autonomous Region of Kosovo and Metohija in the People's Republic of Serbia, Federal People's Republic of Yugoslavia. He studied at the University of Pristina Faculty of Law and holds a master's degree in law. Prior to the 1998-99 Kosovo War, he was involved in civic organizations such as the Council for the Protection of Human Rights and Freedoms in Skenderaj.

Politician
After the end of the Kosovo War in 1999, Gashi became the leader of Skenderaj's municipal assembly; this position was at the time equivalent to mayor. The PDK was the dominant power in the Drenica region of Kosovo during this period, and an August 2000 report in the Christian Science Monitor indicated that former Kosovo Liberation Army (KLA) soldiers affiliated with the party exercised "virtual complete control" in Skenderaj. The rival Democratic League of Kosovo (Lidhja Demokratike e Kosovës, LDK) complained that its members in the area were threatened with violence; Gashi dismissed these claims as "lies and propaganda," saying, "We don't need to threaten any other parties."

The PDK in any case won a landslide victory in Skenderaj in the 2000 Kosovan local elections, taking twenty-seven of thirty-one seats in the municipal assembly. Gashi led the PDK's electoral list and was confirmed as mayor after the election. In July 2002, he was elected as a member of the PDK's steering council. In the 2002 Kosovan local elections, he led the party to another overwhelming victory in Skenderaj and was selected for another term as mayor. He did not seek re-election in 2007.

Assembly member and after
Gashi appeared on the PDK's list in the 2007 Kosovan parliamentary election, which was held under open list proportional representation, and finished in thirty-third place among the party's candidates. The list won thirty-seven seats. Due to a requirement that one-third of mandates be awarded to female candidates, Gashi was not immediately elected. He was, however, second in line among the party's candidates to enter the assembly as a replacement member; since the PDK joined a coalition government after the election and several of its parliamentarians resigned to take ministerial positions, he was able to enter the assembly on the week of its convention in January 2008. Gashi was a member of the committee on legislation and the judiciary and served on a number of other ad hoc committees, including one dealing with laws arising from the Ahtisaari Plan.

He finished in fifty-ninth place among the PDK's candidates in the 2010 assembly election; the list won thirty-four seats, and he was not re-elected. The PDK won the election and remained in government. In May 2012, Gashi was appointed as deputy justice minister in Kosovo's government. He was removed from office a month later, when the newspaper Koha Ditore reported that there was an indictment against him for abuse of office, pertaining to his time as mayor of Skenderaj. He has not returned to active political life since this time. He works as executive director of Kosovo's Free Legal Aid Agency.

Gashi supported Skenderaj mayor Bekim Jashari's unsuccessful bid for re-election in the 2021 Kosovan local elections.

Notes

References

1958 births
Living people
Kosovo Albanians
People from Skenderaj
Members of the Assembly of Kosovo (UNMIK mandate until 2008)
Members of the Assembly of the Republic of Kosovo
Mayors of places in Serbia
Mayors of places in Kosovo
Democratic Party of Kosovo politicians